The Palm Springs Convention Center is a  convention center located in downtown Palm Springs, California. Architect William Pereira designed the original building in 1974. It can accommodate groups from 12 to 12,000 people. The new design, by Fentress Architects, pulls colors and design elements from the surrounding desert. Additional meeting space is available at the attached 410 room convention hotel. It is managed by ASM Global.

See also
List of convention centers in the United States

References

External links 
 
 

Convention centers in California
Buildings and structures in Palm Springs, California
Tourist attractions in Palm Springs, California
William Pereira buildings
Event venues established in 1974